Trygve Seim (born 25 April 1971) is a Norwegian jazz musician (saxophone) and composer. He started to play the saxophone in 1985 after hearing Jan Garbarek's CD Eventyr.

Career 

Seim was born in Oslo. He studied music at Foss videregående skole (1987–90) and attended the Jazz program at the Trondheim Musikkonservatorium (1990–92), where he completed studies in jazz saxophone. Further more Seim studied composition with Terje Bjørklund, Bertil Palmar Johansen, Edward Vesala and Bjørn Kruse.

In 1991, he and fellow student, the pianist Christian Wallumrød founded the group Airamero in 1991, including bassist Johannes Eick and drummer Per Oddvar Johansen. The band released the album Airamero in 1994.  It also undertook several concert tours in Scandinavia and Germany.

Seim became part of Jon Balke's band Oslo 13 in 1992, and took over the joint leadership of this orchestra in 1994 together with Morten Halle and Torbjørn Sunde. Now the band is called 1300 Oslo. He is also a member of jazz quartet The Source with Øyvind Brække, Mats Eilertsen and Per Oddvar Johansen.  They have made five records and played several concert tours all over Europe and Russia, and played with Edward Vesala and Kenny Wheeler.

Seim's debut CD release as a leader, Different Rivers, released on the German record label ECM in 2001, received good reviews all over the world, winning the German Record Critics Prize, "Jahrespreis – Preis der Deutschen Schallplattenkritik".  Since then, he has released several records on ECM.

He has, more recently, composed music for classical musicians, especially Norwegian mezzo-soprano Anne-Lise Berntsen, soprano Tora Augestad, violinist Atle Sponberg and such as his new work Between Voice and Presence for the Trio Mediaeval.  For the 2006 Vossajazz Festival, he wrote a full-length commissioned concert, Reiser.

In 2014 Seim contributed on Mats Eilertsen's Rubicon, the commissioned work for Vossajazz 2014. On this occasion he was the stand-in for Tore Brunborg who missed the event. Currently (2014) he has been touring with his own Trygve Seim Ensemble performing his own compositions. In addition he collaborates in "Trygve Seim/Frode Haltli Duo", the quartet The Source and soprano Tora Augestad's "Music for a While". He also tour and record within projects like Iro Haarla Quintet, Sinikka Langeland’s group "Starflowers", Jai Shankar Ensemble.

In October, Seim announced on Facebook that his next album Rumi Songs would be released on ECM in early 2016.

Personal life
Seim has two children with the Norwegian journalist and writer Åsne Seierstad (b. 1970).

Discography 
Trygve Seim on records released by ECM Records:
Trygve Seim – “Rumi Songs“ (will be released by ECM Records August 26, 2016, ECM 2449)
Trygve Seim – “Sangam“ (released by ECM Records year 2004, ECM 1797)
Trygve Seim – “Different Rivers“ (released by ECM Records year 2001, ECM 1744)
Trygve Seim / Andreas Utnem – “Purcor” (released by ECM Records year 2010, ECM 2186)
Trygve Seim / Frode Haltli – ”Yeraz” (released by ECM Records year 2008, ECM 2044)
Trygve Seim / Øyvind Brække / Per Oddvar Johansen – “The Source and Different Cikadas“ (released by ECM Records year 2002, ECM 1764)
The Source – “The Source“ (released by ECM Records year 2006, ECM 1966)
Sinikka Langeland – “The Magical Forest” (released by ECM Records in August 2016)
Mats Eilertsen – “Rubicon“ (will be released by ECM Records August 2016)
Iro Haarla – “Ante Lucem“ (will be released by ECM Records August 2016)
Sinikka Langeland – “The Half-Finished Heaven“ (released by ECM Records in 2015, ECM 2015)
Jacob Young – Forever Young (released by ECM Records year 2014, ECM 2366)
Sinikka Langeland – “The Land That Is Not” (released by ECM Records year 2011, ECM 2210)
Iro Haarla – “Vespers“ (released by ECM Records year 2011, ECM 2172)
Manu Katché – Playground (released by ECM Records year 2007, ECM 2016)
Sinikka Langeland – “Starflowers“ (released by ECM Records year 2007, ECM 1996)
Iro Haarla – “Northbound“ (released by ECM Records year 2005, ECM 1918)
Christian Wallumrød – “Sofienberg Variations“ (released by ECM Records year 2003, ECM 1809)
Manu Katche – “Touchstones for Manu Katche“ (released by ECM Records year 2014, ECM 2014)
Various Artists – “Selected Signs“ (released by ECM Records year 2013, ECM 2350-55)
Arild Andersen – “Celebration“ (as composer, released by ECM Records year 2012, ECM 2259)

Trygve Seim on records released by other record labels:

The Source – “The Source: of Summer“ (released on GRAPPA Records year 2013, GRCD4416)
The Source – “The Source: of Christmas Live“ (released on GRAPPA Records year 2007, GRCD 4215)
Motorpsycho and The Source – “The MotorSource Massacre“ (released on Stickman Records year 2000, 3RD EAR 0200)
Trygve Seim / Havard Lund / Njål Ølnes / Audun Kleive – “Decoy” (released on Turn Left Productions year 1998, TURNCD497)
The Source – “The Source: of Christmas“ (released on Curling Legs year 1996, CLCD 63)
The Source – “Olemanns kornett“ (released on Curling Legs year 1994, CLCD 63)
Trygve Seim / Christian Wallumrød / Johannes Eick / Per Oddvar Johansen – “Airamero“ (released on ODIN Records year 1994, NJ 40492)
Harr & Hartberg – “Døden er dårlig gjort” (released by Feber Records year 2014, FEBERCD001)
Odd Nordstoga – “Bestevenn“ (released by Sonet/Universal year 2011)
1300 Oslo – “Live In The North“ (released on Curling Legs year 2001, CLCD 63)
Jørn Skogheim – “Above Water” (released on Curling Legs year 2007, CLCD 99)
Petter Wettre – “Mystery unfolds” (released on Bp/Universal year 2001, BP 01009)
Jacob Young Band – “Glow” (released on Curling Legs year 2001, CLPCD 60)
Geir Lysne Listening Ensemble – “Aurora Borealis” (released on Groove Records year 2000, GR 19932)
Motorpsycho – “Trust Us” (released on Stickman Records year 1998, FLAC-2CD)
Jacob Young Band – “Pieces of Time” (released on Curling Legs year 1997, CLPCD 37)
Squid – “Super” (released on Forward Records year 1997, FWCD005)
Håvard Lund – “Letters” (released on Turn Left Productions year 1996)
Jon Balke Oslo 13 – “Live” (released on Curling Legs year 1993, CLCD 07)
Bodega Band – “En Flik Av…” (released on Plateselskapet year 1992)

References

External links 
 Trygve Seim Official website of the musician.
 AllMusic Artist page on AllMusic platform.

20th-century Norwegian saxophonists
21st-century Norwegian saxophonists
Norwegian jazz saxophonists
Norwegian jazz composers
ECM Records artists
Musicians from Oslo
Living people
Norwegian University of Science and Technology alumni
1971 births
20th-century saxophonists
1300 Oslo members
The Source (band) members